Shmuel Ben-Zvi (born 1948) is a Soviet-Israeli journalist. He was Head of International Broadcasting – Voice of Israel – IBA (Israel Broadcasting Authority) from 1991 to 2011.

Biography
Shmuel Ben-Zvi (birth name: Samuil Zvizon) was born to a Jewish family in Vilnius, Lithuania on 27 May 1948. He read history at Vilnius University from 1967 to 1971. As a young man he and his father (Binyamin Zvizon) were actively involved in the activities of the local Jewish folk ensemble which symbolized the fight of Soviet Jews for repatriation to Israel. He eventually left for Israel in 1971. During the period 1972–73 he read Sovietology at the Hebrew University of Jerusalem. He was one of the founders of the Israeli folk ensemble "Anachnu Kan" ("We are here"). For many years he was its executive director. Under his leadership the ensemble "Anachnu Kan" has achieved considerable success in many countries. In 1990, the executive board of the Jewish Agency for Israel (JAFI) Sochnut has suggested to Shmuel Ben-Zvi, the prospective managing director of Israel's Radio external services to create the first ever representation mission in Moscow. In November 1990 Shmuel Ben-Zvi became the first official representative of Sochnut in Russia.  The documents were processed at the Dutch embassy in Moscow. Then as a journalist of Israel's State Radio he came up with the idea of cooperation with Russian radio and TV. Soon afterwards in February 1991 a delegation of Israel's Radio executives led by Director General Arie Mekel has arrived in the USSR. They have met with the executive board of Ostankino, the headquarters of Russian radio and TV. These constructive negotiations led to the signing of a cooperation agreement. In the summer of 1991 Michael Karpin, the first ever reporter of Israel's state TV Channel 1 arrived in Moscow. So started the cooperation between Israeli and Russian media. In 1993, Grigory Ratner, who held the post of deputy chief editor of Rostelevidenje Channel 1 ITA (Russian TV) took a business trip to Israel. Together with Shmuel Ben-Zvi, by then the managing director of Israel's Radio external services, they persuaded the Cable TV network in Israel to pay Russian TV for rebroadcasting Channel 1-Ostankino programmes. As a result, cable TV network Yes came into being.

Family 
He is married to the opera singer, musician and pianist Eva Ben-Zvi.

Publications

Literature

References

External links 
Website of Shmuel Ben-Zvi

People from Kaunas
Living people
1948 births
Soviet emigrants to Israel
Israeli reporters and correspondents
Israel Broadcasting Authority
Israeli Ashkenazi Jews
Lithuanian Jews
Israeli radio journalists